Jaxson Rahme (born 4 December 2003) is a Lebanon international rugby league footballer who plays as a  forward for the South Sydney Rabbitohs in the NSW Cup.

Background
Rahme is of Lebanese descent.

He was educated at Holy Cross College, Ryde.

He played for Holy Cross Ryde and the Dundas Shamrocks at junior level.

Playing career

Club career
Rahme came through the youth system at the Balmain Tigers, playing in the Harold Matthews Cup in 2019 and the S.G. Ball Cup in 2020 and 2021.

In 2022 he moved to the South Sydney Rabbitohs, playing in their S.G. Ball Cup and their Jersey Flegg Cup side in 2022.

International career
Rahme was called up to the Australian Schoolboys side in 2021.

In 2022 he was named in the Lebanon squad for the 2021 Rugby League World Cup.

Rahme made his international debut in October 2022 against Ireland in Leigh.

References

External links
South Sydney Rabbitohs profile
Lebanon profile

2003 births
Living people
South Sydney Rabbitohs players
Rugby league second-rows
Lebanon national rugby league team players